Monster is the second studio album by gothic rock band One-Eyed Doll. It was released on 15 November 2008.
The song "PAO!" is sung entirely in Mandarin, a language Freeman is fluent in.

Track listing

Personnel 

Guitar, Vocals - Kimberly Freeman

Drums - Paul Evans

References 

2008 albums